The Nyenchen Tanglha Mountains (officially spelt Nyainqêntanglha Mountains in Chinese) are a  long mountain range, and subrange of the Transhimalaya System, located in Tibet and the Tibet Autonomous Region of China.

Geography 

The range is parallel to the Himalayas in the Transhimalayas, and north of the Brahmaputra River. Another source says the Nyenchen Tanglha Mountains extend  from Nyêmo County in the west to Ranwu County (the southwestern part of Baxoi County) in the east.

Most of the mountains are below .

The Nyenchen Tanglha Mountains have an average latitude of 30°30'N and a longitude between 90°E and 97°E. Together with the Gangdise Shan located further west, it forms the Transhimalaya which runs parallel to the Himalayas north of the Yarlung Tsangpo River.

The Drukla Chu river rises in the Nyenchen Tanglha Mountains, where it is called the Song Chu river, and joins the Gyamda Chu river.

Subranges 

West Nyenchen Tanglha 

The West Nyenchen Tanglha lies to the southeast of Namtso. The range trends to the northeast, and forms part of the northern watershed of the Yarlung Tsangpo River. The northeastern section is drained by the Lhasa River, the largest tributary of the Yarlung Tsangpo. West Nyenchen Tanglha includes the four highest peaks in the range, all above : Mount Nyenchen Tanglha (7162m), Nyenchen Tanglha II (7117m), Nyenchen Tanglha III (7046m) and Jomo Gangtse (7048m), all located in Damxung County of Lhasa. West Nyenchen Tanglha separates the basins of the Yarlung Tsangpo in the south from the endorheic basins of the Changtang in the north.

East Nyenchen Tanglha 
East Nyenchen Tanglha, located in Nagqu, Chamdo and Nyingchi, marks the water divide between the Yarlung Tsangpo to the south and the Nak Chu river (which becomes the Nujiang and Salween in its lower reach) to the north.

Large areas of the eastern sector are snow-covered. Two-thirds of the glaciers, accounting for five-sixths of the area, lie in the eastern section. This section receives the southwest monsoons, which enter the Tibetan plateau at the Yarlung Zanbo river's Grand Bend. The air is forced up by the terrain, and yields the highest rainfall and moistest air of the plateau, which feeds the development of glaciers.

Most of the peaks in East Nyenchen Tanglha, sometimes called the Alps of Tibet, are unclimbed. Sepu Kangri itself was attempted twice by Chris Bonington and Charles Clarke in 1997 and 1998, about which experience Bonington and Clarke wrote the book Tibet's Secret Mountain: The Triumph of Sepu Kangri. The summit was finally reached on 2 October 2002 by Mark Newcomb and Carlos Buhler.

See also 
 Transhimalaya
 Lhasa terrane
 Karakoram fault system
 Geology of the Himalaya

Notes

References

Citations

Sources

Further reading

External links 
 

Mountain ranges of Tibet
Transhimalayas